The Qingtian Hall is a hall in Jinhu Township, Kinmen County, Taiwan.

History
The hall was originally constructed in 1962 after the Second Taiwan Strait Crisis in 1958 as a place for the stations and posts of the Republic of China Armed Forces and medical shelter. The hall was created by using dynamite.

Geology
The hall is located at the hillside of Mount Taiwu.

Architecture
The hall spans over 50 meters long, 18 meters wide and 11 meters high. The hall is connected with other tunnels.

See also
 List of tourist attractions in Taiwan

References

1962 establishments in Taiwan
Buildings and structures in Kinmen County
Jinhu Township
Military installations established in 1962